The Belarus International in badminton is an international open held in Belarus since 2018 and are thereby one of the most recent international championships in Europe.

After the 2022 Russian invasion of Ukraine, the Badminton World Federation (BWF) banned all Belarusian players and officials from BWF events, and cancelled all BWF tournaments in Belarus.

Previous winners
The table below gives an overview of the winners at the tournament.

Performances by nation

References

Badminton in Belarus
Recurring sporting events established in 2018